The Hanging Temple, also Hengshan Hanging Temple, Hanging Monastery or Xuankong Temple is a temple built into a cliff ( above the ground) near Mount Heng in Hunyuan County, Datong City, Shanxi Province, China. The closest city is Datong,  to the northwest. Along with the Yungang Grottoes, the Hanging Temple is one of the main tourist attractions and historical sites in the Datong area. Built more than 1,500 years ago, this temple is notable not only for its location on a sheer precipice but also because it is the only existing temple with the combination of three Chinese traditional philosophies or three religions (三教): Buddhism, Taoism, and Confucianism. The structure is kept in place with oak crossbeams fitted into holes chiseled into the cliffs. The main supportive structure is hidden inside the bedrock. The monastery is located in the small canyon basin, and the body of the building hangs from the middle of the cliff under the prominent summit, protecting the temple from rain erosion and sunlight bake.

History
According to legend, construction of the temple was started at the end of the Northern Wei dynasty by only one man, a monk named Liaoran in 491 AD. Over the next 1,400 years, many repairs and extensions have led to its present-day scale.

Overview
The distance from north to south is longer than from east to west and it becomes higher and higher from the gate in the south to north along the mountain. The temple can be divided into a northern and southern section.

Northern section 
The northern section contains: 

 Wufo Hall - The Hall of the Five Tathagatas
 Guanyin Hall - Hall of the bodhisattva Guanyin
 Hall of Three Religions. The Hall of Three Religions mainly enshrines Buddhist deities as well as both Taoism and Confucianism. The statues of Sakyamuni (middle), Lao-Tze (left) and Confucius (right) are enshrined in the hall. This reflects the prevailing idea of "Three Teaching Harmonious as One" in the Ming and Qing dynasties (1368–1911).

Southern section 
The southern part has three floors, it contains the following halls: 

 Chunyang Palace - for worshiping Lü Dongbin - one of the Eight Immortals of Taoism
 Sanguan Hall  (Hall of the Three Officials) - the largest hall in the temple, in which the "Three Great Emperor-Officials" (the officials of Heaven, Earth and Water) are worshiped with Ming era clay sculptures.
 Leiyin Hall (Thunder Hall) - A Buddhist hall dedicated to Buddha Shakyamuni located at the top of the southern section.

Gallery

References

External links

Hanging Temple, Class II Protected Sites in China, from ChinaCulture.org. Retrieved d.d. January 1, 2010. 
History of the Hanging Monastery 
Geo Architecture and Landscape in China's geographic and Historic Context (2016). Book by Fang Wang. Page 102-112.  

Buddhist temples in Datong
Datong
6th-century establishments in China
6th-century Buddhist temples
Visionary environments
Major National Historical and Cultural Sites in Shanxi
Three teachings